Jockey is a 2021 American drama film written by Greg Kwedar and Clint Bentley, who also is the director. The film stars Clifton Collins Jr., Molly Parker and Moises Arias.

The film had its world premiere at the 2021 Sundance Film Festival on January 31, 2021.

Plot
The health of horse rider Jackson Silva begins to deteriorate after decades of work. With the help of a promising new horse and his trainer, Ruth, Jackson prepares for the upcoming championship, which could be his last.

Cast
 Clifton Collins Jr. as Jackson Silva
 Molly Parker as Ruth Wilkes
 Moisés Arias as Gabriel Boullait
 Logan Cormier as Leo Brock
 Colleen Hartnett as Ana Boullait
 Daniel Adams as Jerry Meyer

Release
On January 30, 2021, the film was acquired for distribution by Sony Pictures Classics. Jockey had its world premiere at the 2021 Sundance Film Festival on January 31 in the U.S. Cinema Dramatic Competition section.

Reception

Box office
In the U.S. and Canada, the film earned $2,789 from three theaters in its opening weekend. From two theaters, the film made $969 in its second weekend, and $1,913 in its third.

Critical response

Accolades
Sundance Film Festival: Special Jury Prize for Acting - Clifton Collins Jr.

References

External links
 
 
Official screenplay

American drama films
American independent films
2021 drama films
2021 independent films
Sony Pictures Classics films
2020s English-language films
Sundance Film Festival award winners
2020s American films